Chris Carey, FBA is a British classical scholar, currently Professor Emeritus of Greek at University College London (UCL). He held the Professorship of Greek at UCL, from 2003 until his retirement in 2016.  In April 2000 The Independent named him one of the "stars of modern classical scholarship".

Biography
Carey began his career at Cambridge University, as a research fellow at Jesus College, before moving to St Andrews University, where he taught from 1977 to 1991 except for a visiting professorship at University of Minnesota in 1987–8. While in Minnesota he also taught at Carleton College. In 1991 he was elected Professor of Classics at Royal Holloway, University of London before moving to UCL to take up the Chair of Greek in 2003.  He was elected a Fellow of the British Academy in 2012.

Teaching
At UCL he taught Ancient Greek.

Scholarship
Carey's PhD was on Pindar and was supervised by P. E. Easterling, John Killen and Sir Denys Page. Over the years he has also published on lyric poetry, Homer and Athenian law. He recently completed the Oxford Text of the orator Lysias.

He is currently under contract to produce a Cambridge University Press commentary on Book 7 of Herodotus.

Outside activities
Carey is well known for his love of London and London life. He is a proselytizer for Classics, giving frequent lectures to school audiences, and is a patron of The Iris Project.

References

External links
 UCL – University College London
 Iris Magazine

British classical scholars
Year of birth missing (living people)
Living people
Academics of University College London
Fellows of Jesus College, Cambridge
Academics of the University of St Andrews
Academics of Royal Holloway, University of London
Classical scholars of the University of London
Fellows of the British Academy